Castellaneta is a surname. Notable people with the surname include:

Carlo Castellaneta (1930-2013), Italian author and journalist
Dan Castellaneta (born 1957), American actor, comedian, producer and screenwriter
P. J. Castellaneta (born 1960), American film director
Sergio Castellaneta (1932–2018), Italian politician